The 1997 All-Ireland Senior Football Championship Final was the 110th All-Ireland Final and the deciding match of the 1997 All-Ireland Senior Football Championship, an inter-county Gaelic football tournament for the top teams in Ireland.

Kerry bridged an 11-year gap, the longest in their history, helped by nine Maurice Fitzgerald points. Fitzgerald also broke Billy O'Shea's leg on the pitch.

Mayo in their second Final appearance in a row, were hoping to bridge a gap that stretched all the way back to their All-Ireland football title winning team of 1951. They failed, and would lose again to Kerry in 2004 and 2006. Subsequent All-Ireland finals defeats followed for Mayo at the hands of Donegal in 2012 and Dublin in 2013, 2016, 2017, 2020 and Tyrone in 2021.

References

External links
 Liam Hassett's 1997 All-Ireland winning speech

All-Ireland Senior Football Championship Final
All-Ireland Senior Football Championship Final, 1997
All-Ireland Senior Football Championship Finals
All-Ireland Senior Football Championship Finals
Kerry county football team matches
Mayo county football team matches